Elections were held in Lambton County, Ontario on October 25, 2010 in conjunction with municipal elections across the province.

Lambton County Council

Brooke-Alvinston

Dawn-Euphemia

Enniskillen

Lambton Shores

Oil Springs

Petrolia

Plympton-Wyoming

Point Edward

Sarnia

St. Clair

Warwick

2010 Ontario municipal elections
Lambton County